Gervasius de Wolvehope (fl. 1295–1302) was an English Member of Parliament.

He was a Member (MP) of the Parliament of England for Lewes in 1295, 1298 and 1302.

References

13th-century births
14th-century deaths
English MPs 1295
English MPs 1298
English MPs 1302
People from Lewes